Gregory Peter Panos (born September 24, 1956) is an American  writer, futurist, educator, strategic planning consultant, conference / event producer, and technology evangelist in augmented reality, virtual reality, human simulation, motion capture, performance animation, 3D character animation, human-computer interaction, and user experience design.

Morton Heilig, Dr. Phillip Mittleman, Dr. Alexander Schure, and John Whitney Sr. were mentors to Greg during his early exploration of computer graphics as a career path.

Greg has also worked as an actor and production assistant in several American films including White Trash (1992).

Education
 Theodore Roosevelt High School (Yonkers, New York) – 1974
 Ohio University – Bachelor of Science (BSc) cum laude in Communications and minor in Film – 1978.

While at OU, he worked in all aspects of television production for WOUB-TV a PBS TV station based in Athens, Ohio, as he also studied electronic music, journalism, and photography.

 California State University, Long Beach (CSULB) – 1994 – As a graduate level instructor in "advanced virtual reality" for the CSULB Media Arts department.

Career

Marketing
In New York, Greg worked with pioneering computer animation studios MAGI-Synthavision and Digital Effects.

While briefly serving as an instructor for basic television production at New York Institute of Technology (NYIT) in Old Westbury, New York, he was recruited into CGL, Inc. (the newly created commercial venture) to market, forecast and plan strategy to spin off technology developed at the legendary NYIT Computer Graphics Lab.

While at NYIT Greg rubbed shoulders with many CGL veterans including Lance Williams, Pat Hanrahan, Carter Burwell, Fred Parke, Peter Oppenheimer and many others.

Engineering
Mr. Panos moved to California in 1982 to work with GTI Inc. (subsequently acquired by Rediffusion Simulation) as an applications engineer for their novel real-time (computer) image generation system the "POLY2000" which found a place in many aerospace companies including Rockwell International.

Greg joined the Rockwell Space Station Systems Division (SSSD) as a member of the technical staff (MTS) and lead engineer instrumental in creating their premiere visualization / simulation laboratory to employing real-time, flight simulation technology toward visualization of preliminary designs for early proposals to NASA for the  International Space Station project.

After Space Station, Greg was employed as an applications engineer in the West Coast offices of Star Technologies, Inc. While there, his fellow Star colleagues were Michael T. Jones (current CTO, Google Earth) and Dave Orton former CEO, ATI Technologies.

Consultant
As a consultant to film director Brett Leonard during pre-production, Greg was instrumental in helping define some of the key visual props used in the "Lawnmower Man" a seminal film which first used virtual reality as plot vehicle for a major motion picture.

Writer
 Augmented Reality Sourcebook

As an author, Greg is writing, editing and will publish the "Augmented Reality Sourcebook" in 2012. This work will be the  first comprehensive research directory, forecasting and strategic planning compendium for the emerging field of Augmented Reality, AR App developers, Component suppliers, AR design studios, research labs, consultants, events, publications, seminars, etc.

 Virtual Reality Sourcebook

As an author, Greg wrote, edited and published the "Virtual Reality Sourcebook" the first comprehensive research directory, forecasting and strategic planning compendium for the emerging market of virtual reality, human-computer interaction and real-time synthetic environment design / production. The evolving document found a home in libraries of many major corporations and institutions aiding their diligence in research and new market development.

 Virtual Reality Magazine (Editor) (1994–1996)
 Computer Graphics World (Magazine) (freelance writer)
 Animation World Network (Magazine) (freelance writer)

Professional organizations
As twice-elected Chairman of SIGGRAPH-LA (in Los Angeles and the largest local chapter for the SIGGRAPH professional organization) he worked to promote and recognize computer graphics and animation with emerging organizations in the CGI / Visual FX industry for motion pictures / TV, virtual reality, virtual actors and performance animation. Greg also held the title of Co-Chairman for SIGGRAPH-LA in the late 1990s.

 SIGGRAPH – Professional Member, Chairman Local Chapter
 NCGA (National Computer Graphics Association) – Professional Member
 Association for Computing Machinery (ACM) – Professional Member
 Performance Animation Society – Founding Co-Director

Greg co-founded the "Performance Animation Society" with Broadway actor / singer Richard Cray in the early 1990s to educate and inform the creative, performing and acting community about the emerging, evolving tools of computer-generated character animation, real-time actor driven performance using motion capture techniques and 3D human digitization to create life-like virtual actors.

1993 Greg produced "A Musical Performance Animation", the first musical, operatic vocal performance by a real-time 3D computer generated character.

Speaking engagements
Greg has been invited to make numerous presentations and demonstrations at major conferences to illustrate the relevancy of virtual reality and computer generated imagery technology to enhance the future of human civilization:

 World Science Fiction Convention
 California State University, Northridge (CSUN) 1994 VR Conference
 SIGGRAPH – LA-SIGGRAPH, National Conference participation
 National Association of Broadcasters - "Virtualization of Hollywood SuperSession" 1999
 Consumer Electronics Show
 Screen Actors Guild (SAG) - "The Future of Virtual Actors"
 American Film Institute (AFI) - "Aspects of Virtual Reality in Film"
 Comdex
 Digital Hollywood "Building Compelling 3D Communities and E-commerce Venues on the Net" 2000
 Virtual Reality World
 VR & Persons with Disabilities - "Using VR to Document Human Existence"
 The Learning Annex
 USC School of Cinematic Arts
 University of California, Los Angeles
 California State University, Long Beach (CSULB)
 California State University, Los Angeles
 Los Angeles Future Salon – Human Simulation 2003

Current direction
 Persona Foundation

In the year 2000, Greg founded the "Persona Foundation" to further initiatives in human simulation, motion capture, 3D body and facial scanning, digital persona creation and custom platform development / operating system design for human simulation systems.

Works

Filmography
 The Wanderers (1979) – (as production assistant)
 The Warriors (1979) – (as production assistant)
 White Trash (1992) – (as actor)
 The Lawnmower Man (1992) – (as consultant to director)

Publications
 Humans Enter the Age of Avatarism (2020) 
 Augmented Reality Sourcebook (2011- onward)
 Virtual Reality Sourcebook (1991–1998)
 Virtual Reality Magazine (1994–1996)
 Computer Graphics World (Magazine)
 Animation World Network Magazine (1998) - "Who's Data is that Anyway"

Papers
 "Using Virtual Reality to Document Human Existence" – CSUN 1994 VR Conference

References

External links
 
 Persona Foundation
 Los Angeles Future Salon
 Animation World Network (Magazine) - "Who's Data is that Anyway" 
 Digital Hollywood 2016 - "CG Humans: Integration of the Virtual Character in Film - TV – VR - Games"

American male actors
Ohio University alumni
California State University, Long Beach alumni
1956 births
People from Bronxville, New York
Living people
American male writers
New York Institute of Technology faculty